The Church of St Dubricius in Porlock, Somerset, England dates from the 13th century. The church has been designated by English Heritage as a Grade I listed building.

The dedication is to Dubricius (also known in Welsh as Dyfrig and in corrupt Norman-French as Devereux) (c. 465 – 550 or 612), a 6th-century Briton ecclesiastic venerated as a saint and may indicate he travelled to the area.

The church stands on the site of an earlier church which may date from around 1120. Restoration work was undertaken in the 15th century. The spire was damaged in a storm of 1703. Further restoration was undertaken between 1888 and 1891.

Within the church is the very fine late 15th century alabaster tomb of John Harington, 4th Baron Harington (1384–1418) who fought alongside King Henry V in France in 1417, and his wife Elizabeth Courtenay (died 1471), daughter of Edward de Courtenay, 3rd Earl of Devon (died 1419). Elizabeth survived her first husband and married secondly William Bonville, 1st Baron Bonville (died 1461). The style of armour worn by Baron Harington is of the period c.1470, as was worn in the time of his widow's death, and is not therefore an accurate representation of the armour worn at the time of his death in 1418. The monument and effigies are believed to have been erected at the expense of Elizabeth's step-daughter the great heiress Cicely Bonville, Baroness Harington and Marchioness of Dorset (1460–1529), and are considered from their very high quality "more befitting a cathedral than a retired country church". At the back of the nave is a clock dating from the early 15th century which struck the tenor bell hourly. It has no hands or clock face. The clock was used until 1897 when a new clock was installed to celebrate Queen Victoria's jubilee.

The parish is part of the benefice of Porlock and Porlock Weir with Stoke Pero, Selworthy and Luccombe within the Exmoor deanery.

See also
Grade I listed buildings in West Somerset
List of ecclesiastical parishes in the Diocese of Bath and Wells

References

External links
Porlock Parish website

Church of England church buildings in West Somerset
13th-century church buildings in England
Grade I listed churches in Somerset
Grade I listed buildings in West Somerset